Burnt Toast Vinyl is an independent record label based in Philadelphia, Pennsylvania.

History
Burnt Toast Vinyl was founded by Scott Hatch, a Drexel University student who had initially been involved with concert promotion at the school. The label has released full albums from several prominent Philadelphia indie musicians, as well as releasing or re-releasing material on vinyl from artists, including those on the Tooth & Nail roster. Among its reissues are the debut album from Scaterd Few, re-released by Burnt Toast in 2015.

Several of Burnt Toast's post rock and experimental groups attracted notice from magazines such as Dusted and Prefix. Among the label's best-known releases are those by Denison Witmer, Unwed Sailor, and Saxon Shore.

Roster

All American Radio
Aspera
The Blamed
Bosque Brown
Byul.org
Circle of Birds
Early Day Miners
Efterklang
Emperor X
Ester Drang
Explosions in the Sky
Farquar Muckenfuss
Foxhole
The Huntingtons
In a Lonely Place
Isolation Years
Jetenderpaul
June Panic
Damien Jurado
The Magic Lantern
mewithoutYou
Mount Eerie
Movies With Heroes
Octane Blue
The Operation (formerly Sans Culottes)
Don Peris (of The Innocence Mission)
Psalters
Questions in Dialect
Ran Away to Sea
Reels of White Softly Flow
Saxon Shore
Scaterd Few
Scientific
The Six Parts Seven
Somerset
Soporus
Starflyer 59
Sufjan Stevens
The Trouble with Sweeney
Unwed Sailor
Denison Witmer
Woven Hand
Yndi Halda
Yume Bitsu

See also
List of record labels

References

External links
Official website

Culture of Philadelphia
Companies based in Philadelphia
American independent record labels